After the Fire Over Russia (Bulgarian: След пожара над Русия; Sled pozhara nad Rusiya) is a 1929 Bulgarian silent drama film directed by Boris Grezov and starring Tacho Kolarov, Baronesa Loudon and Konstantin Kisimov. The film is based on a novel by Pancho Mihaylov. It portrays the lives of a group of White Russians who fled into exile in Bulgarian to work in local mines following the Russian Revolution.

Cast
 Tacho Kolarov as Aleksey Arseniev  
 Baronesa Loudon as Nataliya Noykova  
 Konstantin Kisimov as Garbitzata 
 Titi Tarnovska as Rositza  
 Dimitar Keranov as Inzhener Pavel Noykov  
 Vladimir Karpov as Stepan  
 Docho Kasabov as Dyado Ivan 
 Ivan Kasabov 
 Vasil Karakanovski
 Rayna Chukleva
 Mihail Slavov

References

Bibliography 
 Taylor, Richard. The BFI companion to Eastern European and Russian cinema. British Film Institute, 2000.

External links 
 

1929 films
1929 drama films
Bulgarian silent films
1920s historical drama films
Bulgarian-language films
Bulgarian historical drama films
Russian Revolution films
Films directed by Boris Grezov
Films set in Bulgaria
Bulgarian black-and-white films
Silent drama films